The 1968 Wichita Shockers football team was an American football team that represented Wichita State University as a member of the Missouri Valley Conference during the 1968 NCAA University Division football season. In its first season under head coach Eddie Kriwiel, the team compiled a 0–10 record (0–5 against conference opponents), finished in last place out of six teams in the MVC, and was outscored by a total of 342 to 131. The team played its home games at Veterans Field, now known as Cessna Stadium.

Schedule

References

Wichita State
Wichita State Shockers football seasons
College football winless seasons
Wichita State Shockers football